Walter Arnold (27 August 1909 – 11 July 1979) was a German stonemason and sculptor. Between 1957 and 1964 he was the president of the Association of Visual Artists (DDRA / Verband Bildender Künstler) in East Germany.

Life

Early years
Walter Arnold was the son of a Leipzig Stonemason.  He trained between 1924 and 1928 in wood carving and stone sculpture. Between 1928 and 1932 he studied the shapes of sculptures and ceramics under Alfred Thiele at the School of Craftsmanship at Leipzig. After finishing his studies he worked as an assistant to Thiele until 1933, after which he worked as a freelance artist, supporting himself with contract work, including grave stone business and stonework renovation jobs.  He was a soldier during the war, ending up in a prison camp just outside Bad Kreuznach. Returning home to Leipzig, in November 1946 he joined what was shortly to become ruling SED (party) of what was in the process of becoming the German Democratic Republic (East Germany).

Academic progress
1946 was also the year in which Walter Arnold started to teach at the Academy of Visual Arts in Leipzig. In 1949 he accepted an invitation to move to the Dresden Academy of Fine Arts where he worked as a professor until 1970. His students included Reinhard Dietrich. He then returned to the Academy in Leipzig where he was designated an emeritus professor in 1974, but continued to give master classes.

Political progress
Arnold became a member of the East German Academy of Culture in 1952. From 1952 to 1962 he was a Candidate for the Central Committee of The Party, being a member of it from 1958 till 1961.

In 1958 he succeeded Otto Nagel as the president of the country's Association of Visual Artists (DDRA / Verband Bildender Künstler). Arnold retained this position till 1964.

Last things
Walter Arnold died in 1979 in Dresden, where he is buried, now with his wife Maria, in the Loschwitz Cemetery, under an image created by himself.

Some works

in bronze

Wäscherin, 1947
Bauarbeiter, 1947
Tanzpause, 1947
ein frühes Denkmal für Opfer des Faschismus auf dem Südfriedhof (Leipzig) (an early memorial for victims of Fascism at the Southern Cemetery, Leipzig), 1949
Jugend – Baumeister der DDR, 1951: Ausgangspunkt für den ersten Nationalpreis der DDR an einen Künstler
Traktoristin (woman driving a tractor), 1953
Befreite Arbeit – schöneres Leben (Liberating work – beautiful life), 1961
Ernst-Thälmann-Denkmal in Stralsund, 1962
Bäuerin – (Farmer's wife) Year unknown, exhibited in front of the Agricultural Museum at Wandlitz from 1975 till 2008: now in storage
Clara Zetkin Memorial in Leipzig, 1967 in the Leipzig Johanna Park (formerly the Clara Zetkin Park)

wood carvings

Das Grauen 1934
Das Leid 1946: aus einer gespaltenen Bohle gearbeitet, erinnert an seine Kriegsgefangenschaft
Vietnam klagt an (Viet Nam complains), 1966
Vorwärts und nicht vergessen – die Solidarität (Onwards and don't forget – Solidarity), 1967
Venceremos (We shall overcome), 1974
Anette
Es gibt kein fremdes Leid

portrait-busts and statuettes
Felix Mendelssohn Bartholdy, 1947 im Leipziger Musikviertel
Carl Maria von Weber, 1952
Ernst Thälmann, 1956[4]
Karl Liebknecht and Rosa Luxemburg, 1957
Otto Buchwitz, 1962

in memoriam
Inge, 1949
Badende, 1961
Aphrodite, 1971

References

External links 

1909 births
1979 deaths
Artists from Leipzig
People from the Kingdom of Saxony
Members of the Central Committee of the Socialist Unity Party of Germany
East German artists
20th-century German sculptors
20th-century German male artists
German male sculptors
German Army personnel of World War II
Recipients of the Patriotic Order of Merit in silver
Recipients of the Banner of Labor
Recipients of the National Prize of East Germany
German prisoners of war in World War II held by the United States